The Hawkinsville Commercial and Industrial Historic District is a historic district in Georgia, United States that was listed on the National Register of Historic Places in 2004.

The district includes the Pulaski County Courthouse (1874)  and the Hawkinsville Opera House (1907), which are both listed separately on the National Register.  The layout of the commercial center of the town is on the Augusta plan, in which the courthouse is located on a main street rather than upon a central square.

It includes 92 contributing buildings, four other contributing structures, one contributing site and one contributing object.  It also includes 38 non-contributing buildings and two non-contributing objects.

Photos

References

External links
 

Historic districts on the National Register of Historic Places in Georgia (U.S. state)
Italianate architecture in Georgia (U.S. state)
Romanesque Revival architecture in Georgia (U.S. state)
Buildings and structures completed in 1830
National Register of Historic Places in Pulaski County, Georgia